Juniperus gamboana is a species of conifer in the family Cupressaceae. It is found in Guatemala and Mexico, where it is threatened by habitat loss.

References

Sources

gamboana
Vulnerable plants
Taxonomy articles created by Polbot